Forgas or Forgàs may refer to:

 Ernest Forgàs (born 1993), Spanish footballer 
 Josep Forgas, Spanish footballer (played 1920s–1940s)
 Joseph Paul Forgas (born 1947), Australian social psychologist
 Patrick Forgas, founder of Forgas Band Phenomena, a French band
 Forgas, an old name for the River Fergus in Ireland

See also
 Forges (disambiguation)